Sébastien Demarbaix (born 19 December 1973) is a Belgian former racing cyclist, who rode in three editions of the Tour de France. He currently works as a directeur sportif for UCI ProTeam  and its junior team, UCI Continental team .

Major results
1994
1st Stage 5 Tour de Wallonie
1998
2nd Stadsprijs Geraardsbergen
1999
3rd Japan Cup

References

External links
 

1973 births
Living people
Belgian male cyclists
People from Lessines
Cyclists from Hainaut (province)